The qualification for the 1989 European Competition for Women's Football was held between September 10, 1987, and December 17, 1988. The winners of the quarter-finals qualified.

Group stage

Group 1

Group 2

Scotland withdrew.

Group 3

Group 4

: KBVB report is unclear about the first goal, attributing the goal to both Marina Verdonck and Nathalie Schrymecker.

Quarterfinals

First leg

Second leg

Sweden, Norway, Italy and West Germany qualified for the final tournament.

References

External links
1987–89 UEFA Women's EURO at UEFA.com
Tables & results at RSSSF.com

UEFA Women's Championship qualification
UEFA
UEFA
Qualifying